is a Japanese football player for Yokohama FC in the J2 League.

National team career
In August 2016, Kamekawa was elected Japan U-23 national team for 2016 Summer Olympics. At this tournament, he played 2 matches as left side back.

Club statistics
Updated to 16 October 2022.

References

External links

Profile at Avispa Fukuoka

1993 births
Living people
Association football people from Osaka Prefecture
People from Minoh, Osaka
Japanese footballers
J1 League players
J2 League players
Shonan Bellmare players
Avispa Fukuoka players
Kashiwa Reysol players
V-Varen Nagasaki players
Yokohama FC players
Footballers at the 2016 Summer Olympics
Olympic footballers of Japan
Association football defenders